Heavy Hearts is the fifth studio album by American metalcore band For the Fallen Dreams. It was released on April 4, 2014, through Rise Records and was produced by Josh Schroeder.

Track listing

Personnel
For the Fallen Dreams
Chad Ruhlig – unclean vocals
Jim Hocking – guitars, clean vocals
Brandon Stastny – bass, backing vocals
Navid Naghdi – drums, percussion

Additional musicians
Garret Rapp of The Color Morale – guest vocals on track 4, "Dream Eater"
Landon Tewers of The Plot in You – guest vocals on track 10, "Smelling Salt"

Additional personnel
Josh Schroeder – production, mixing, mastering, engineering
Orie McGiness – artwork
Andrew Tkaczyk – additional composing on track 1, "Emerald Blue"
Barney Durrett – photography

Charts

References

2014 albums
For the Fallen Dreams albums
Rise Records albums